The acinaces, also spelled akinakes (Greek ) or akinaka (unattested Old Persian *akīnakah, Sogdian kynʼk) is a type of dagger or xiphos (short sword) used mainly in the first millennium BCE in the eastern Mediterranean Basin, especially by the Medes, Scythians, Persians and Caspians, then by the Greeks.

The acinaces, of Scythian origin, but made famous by the Persians, rapidly spread throughout the ancient world. The Romans believed that this weapon originated with the Medes.

The acinaces is typically 40–60 cm (14-18 in.) in length and double-edged, and although there is no universal design, the guard may be lobed with the hilt resembling that of a bollock dagger, or the pommel may be split or of the "antenna" type.  The scabbard as much as anything else defines the acinaces and usually has a large decorative mount near the opening, allowing it to be suspended from a belt on the wearer's right side.

Identification
Ancient texts say very little about the acinaces, other than that it was a type of "Persian sword." Because of this, authors writing in Latin throughout history tended to equate the word with whatever type of weapon the contemporary Persians were using. Thus, it is frequently used in medieval Latin texts to mean scimitar or the like, a meaning it still retains in scientific Latin. Paulus Hector Mair even goes so far as to translate dussack as acinaces, because it is curved like a scimitar, and likewise in the works of Jesuit authors describing Japan, acinaces is used for katana.

However, the Persian shamshir is a relatively recent weapon, and did not exist in antiquity. The Achaemenid-era Persians made use of more than one kind of sword. Ancient Persian art typically shows the king's bodyguards and important nobles wearing ornate diagonal daggers. Greek art, on the other hand, frequently shows Persian soldiers using the kopis. One must therefore do some detective work to figure out which type is the acinaces.

One useful bit of evidence is that Greek and Roman texts sometimes mention the acinaces being given out by the king as a sign of favor. This would tend to point to the dagger.

A ritual use of acinaces, offered as a gift to the sea by the Persian king Xerxes, is also mentioned by Herodotus (History, VII, 54), in the ritual contrition scene following the episode known as Flagellation of Hellespont.

A very revealing passage is found in Josephus' Jewish Antiquities 20.186, where the weapons used by the sicarii are described:

This also seems to indicate that it is the dagger which is properly called the acinaces though there are those who deny this, translating the above passage as "concave like the Roman sica".

Gallery

See also
 List of daggers
 Shamshir

References

External links

Akinakes
Ancient Persian swords

Blade weapons
Ancient Near East weapons
Daggers
Middle Eastern swords
Iranian inventions